Signed Italian (italiano segnato) and Signed Exact Italian (italiano segnato esatto) are manually coded forms of the Italian language used in Italy.  They apply the words (signs) of Italian Sign Language to oral Italian word order and grammar.  The difference is the degree of adherence to the oral language:  Signed Italian is frequently used with simultaneous "translation", and consists of oral language accompanied by sign and fingerspelling.  Signed Exact Italian has additional signs for Italian grammatical endings; it is too slow for general communication, but is designed as an educational bridge between sign and the oral language.

See also
Signed English and Signing Exact English

References

French
Italian language